The Cuba Libre Story is a documentary series that portrays the history of Cuba from colonial times to 2015. The eight-part series was released on Netflix on December 11, 2015.

For The Cuba Libre Story, more than 50 international Cuba experts and contemporary witnesses were interviewed - both supporters and opponents of Fidel Castro and his predecessor Fulgencio Batista. Among them are Cuba's former intelligence chief Juan Antonio Rodríguez Menier and KGB Latin America chief Nikolai Leonov, Che Guevara's comrade Dariel Alarcón and CIA agent Félix Rodríguez, Fidel Castro's former lover Marita Lorenz and his former bodyguard Carlos Calvo, the stepdaughter of mafia boss Meyer Lansky, Cuba's famous novelist Leonardo Padura and the last Head of State of the GDR and personal friend of the Castro brothers, Egon Krenz.

Episodes

References

External links 
  on Netflix
 

2010s American documentary television series
Historical television series
2016 American television series debuts